Jessica Cambensy (born April 18, 1988), also known as Jessica C., is an American-born Hong Kong model and actress.

Background
She is half white and half Filipino Chinese from Chicago. According to her portfolio web page she is last known to be modeling with Model One agency based in Hong Kong.

Personal life
Cambensy met Andy On and started dating in November 2014. In October 2015, she announced that her boyfriend had successfully proposed marriage and that she was three months pregnant. On March 23, 2016, their first daughter, Tessa, was born.

Cambensy and On were married in Hawaii on 16 October 2017, and on December 24 of the same year, she announced her pregnancy on Instagram. She later gave birth to a son, Elvis, on 19 June 2018.

Filmography

Film

References

External links

1988 births
Living people
21st-century American actresses
21st-century Hong Kong actresses
American expatriates in Hong Kong
American people of Chinese descent
American people of Filipino descent
Hong Kong female models